Sarıhan can refer to:

 Sarıhan, Bayburt
 Sarıhan, Karakoçan